Jordan Scarlett (born February 9, 1996) is an American football running back for the Philadelphia Stars of the United States Football League (USFL). He played college football at Florida and was drafted by the Carolina Panthers in the fifth round of the 2019 NFL Draft.

Professional career

Carolina Panthers
Scarlett was drafted by the Carolina Panthers in the fifth round (154th overall) of the 2019 NFL Draft. He entered his rookie year in 2019 as the third running back on the depth chart behind Christian McCaffrey and Reggie Bonnafon. He played in nine games, primarily on special teams, before suffering knee and ankle injuries in Week 12. He was placed on injured reserve on November 29, 2019.

Scarlett was waived on August 23, 2020.

Detroit Lions
On December 16, 2020, Scarlett was signed to the Detroit Lions' practice squad.

Miami Dolphins
On January 12, 2021, Scarlett signed a reserve/future contract with the Miami Dolphins. He was waived on August 31, 2021 and re-signed to the practice squad the next day, but was shortly released. He was re-signed to the practice squad on December 16. His contract expired when the teams season ended on January 9, 2022.

Montreal Alouettes
On April 12, 2022, Scarlett signed with the Montreal Alouettes of the Canadian Football League. He was released on June 5, 2022.

Edmonton Elks
On July 6, 2022, Scarlett signed with the Edmonton Elks practice squad. He was released on July 17, 2022.

Philadelphia Stars
On January 19, 2023, Scarlett signed with the Philadelphia Stars of the United States Football League (USFL).

References

External links
Carolina Panthers bio
Florida Gators bio

1996 births
Living people
Players of American football from Fort Lauderdale, Florida
American football running backs
Florida Gators football players
Carolina Panthers players
Detroit Lions players
Miami Dolphins players
Philadelphia Stars (2022) players